The Fighting Gringo may refer to:

The Fighting Gringo (1917 film)
The Fighting Gringo (1939 film)